Freddy Excelino González Martínez (born 18 June 1975 in La Ceja, Colombia), also known as Fredy González, is a Colombian road racing cyclist. He is a two-time winner of the Mountains classification in the Giro d'Italia (one of cycling's three Grand Tours). His victories came in the 2001 and 2003 races. He also came close to winning in 2000, when he finished second to Francesco Casagrande. González has a total of 34 career victories.

Career achievements

Major results

1998
Vuelta a Colombia
1st Stages 3 & 15
1999
1st Stage 4 Vuelta a Colombia
2nd Overall Vuelta al Táchira
1st Stages 5 & 8
2001
1st  Mountains classification, Giro d'Italia
2nd Trofeo dello Scalatore
3rd Overall Settimana Internazionale di Coppi e Bartali
3rd Overall Giro della Liguria
6th Stausee Rundfahrt
2002
8th Giro del Lazio
2003
Giro d'Italia
1st  Mountains classification 
1st Combativity award
2004
1st  Overall Tour de Langkawi
2nd Overall Vuelta al Táchira
1st Stages 8 & 12
2005
2nd Giro d'Oro
3rd GP Industria & Artigianato Larciano
4th Overall Settimana Ciclista Lombarda
1st Mountains classification
1st Stage 4
2007
1st Stage 11 Vuelta a Colombia
6th Overall Volta do Rio de Janeiro
2010
1st Stage 7 Vuelta a Colombia
2011
1st Stage 13 Vuelta a Colombia
4th Road race, National Road Championships

Grand Tour general classification results timeline

References

External links
Profile at Cyclingnews.com

1975 births
Living people
Colombian male cyclists
Vuelta a Colombia stage winners
Colombian Giro d'Italia stage winners
Vuelta a Venezuela stage winners
Cyclists at the 2000 Summer Olympics
Olympic cyclists of Colombia
Sportspeople from Antioquia Department
20th-century Colombian people